The Brussels Shot Tower is a shot tower located in Brussels, Belgium. It was built in 1898 at the site of a former gunpowder factory that dated back to 1832. The shot tower was used until 1962, making the last one to remain in use in Belgium. It was classified as a National Heritage Site (number 2043-0092/0) in 1984.

It originally had a lantern at the top, and a dome with a weathervane on it.

References 

Shot towers
Protected heritage sites in Brussels
City of Brussels